Jasieniec Iłżecki Górny  is a village in the administrative district of Gmina Iłża, within Radom County, Masovian Voivodeship, in east-central Poland.

The village has a population of 870.

References

Villages in Radom County